The Real World: Chicago is the eleventh season of MTV's reality television series The Real World, which focuses on a group of diverse strangers living together for several months in a different city each season, as cameras follow their lives and interpersonal relationships. It is the first season of The Real World to be filmed in the East North Central States region of the United States, specifically in Illinois.

The season featured seven people who lived in a converted bookstore/coffeehouse in the Chicago's Wicker Park neighborhood, which production started from June 28 until November 3, 2001. This was also the first season in which production would start months (sometimes weeks) after wrapping the previous season allowing filming and broadcasting almost immediately unlike the usual annual season. The season premiered on January 15, 2002 and consisted of 24 episodes. This was the first of two seasons to be filmed in Chicago. Twelve years later, the show returned to the city in its thirtieth season.

The season depicted cast members dealing with learning of the September 11th attacks, although criticism was leveled at the series because the cast was actually at Wrigley Field for a photo shoot when they first learned of the event. However, contrary to rumors, the reactions seen were not staged. Producers brought a television in to the loft so the cast could see the attack footage.

Bunim-Murray Productions experienced a number of problems with the production of this season, including a nearby shooting, and numerous protests, vandalism, and arrests by locals critical of MTV and its parent company, Viacom, and opposed to the production's perceived contribution to the neighborhood's gentrification.

Season changes
This was the first season of The Real World to feature two openly gay cast members, Chris Beckman and Aneesa Ferreira. A previous season, The Real World: Hawaii, featured two LGBT cast members: Justin Deabler, who is gay, and Ruthie Alcaide, who is bisexual.

Assignment
Almost every season of The Real World, beginning with its fifth season, has included the assignment of a season-long group job or task to the housemates, continued participation in which has been mandatory to remain part of the cast since the Back to New York season. The Chicago roommates were assigned to three different jobs at the Chicago Park District. Some were lifeguards at the Lake Michigan beaches while others worked with inner-city children on a park mural. The cast then worked on "Chicagoween" (a portmanteau of "Chicago" and "Halloween") and had to devise a story to act out for the children at Chicago's Halloween celebration.

The residence

The cast resided in a loft at 1934 West North Avenue in the Chicago neighborhood of Wicker Park, which had formerly served as a sweatshop, storage facility, and after falling into disrepair, a drug den in the 1980s. In the late 1990s, it served as the space for Steven Ivcich Acting Studio where Johnny Kastl studied before moving to Los Angeles.  After it was renovated, it served as Urbis Orbis Café, a classic hipster hangout, then an antique shop. Chicago Scenic Studios constructed the loft's interior, and interior decorating was overseen by local designer Suhail. After filming, fixtures and other items used during the production were auctioned off, and the space was converted into a Cheetah Gym, which opened in 2002.

Cast

: Age at the time of filming.

Episodes

After filming
After the cast left the Real World loft, all seven of them appeared to discuss their experiences both during and since their time on the show, Stop Being Polite: The Real World Chicago Reunion, which premiered on July 15, 2002, and was hosted by television personality Brian McFayden.

At the 2008 The Real World Awards Bash, Chris received a nomination in the "Hottest Male" category, while Cara received one for "Biggest Playa".

After the show, Kyle Brandt starred as Phillip Kiriakis on Days of Our Lives on NBC. In 2008, he wrote and produced the TV series Rome is Burning and The Jim Rome Show, a sports radio talk show out of California, on which he appeared as "Lyle Grant". 

Tonya Cooley went to pose for Playboy and appear in productions on Cinemax. She appeared on multiple Challenges before leaving the show's unstable environment, quit drinking due to alcoholism, and returned to Washington to live a regular life and own a salon.

In 2017, Aneesa Ferreira appeared on MTV's Fear Factor, where she was paired with Laurel Stucky from The Challenge: Fresh Meat II. In 2020, Ferreira started hosting the MTV's Official Challenge podcast, alongside fellow castmate Tori Deal from Are You the One?.

The Challenge

Challenge in bold indicates that the contestant was a finalist on the Challenge.

Note: Aneesa made an appearance on Vendettas for an elimination.

References

External links
Official site
The Real World: Chicago: Full Episode Synopses and Recaps. MTV.

Television shows set in Chicago
Television shows filmed in Illinois
Chicago
2002 American television seasons
2002 in Illinois